Alexander Geddes (born 1878) was a Scottish communist activist.

Geddes was born in Wick, and worked there as a fish smoker.  He then moved to Greenock, where he worked in a torpedo factory during World War I.

Geddes joined the Amalgamated Engineering Union and, inspired by the Clyde Workers' Committee, Geddes became a prominent figure in the Greenock Workers' Committee.  His first political speech was in the run-up to the 1918 general election, in support of Fred Shaw, the unsuccessful British Socialist Party candidate for Greenock.

He attended the Communist Unity Convention of 1920 on behalf of the committee, where he argued that there should be an independent Scottish communist party, a view he shared with John Maclean.  As a result, he became a founder member of the Scottish Communist Party, and was appointed as its treasurer.  However, the views of the party's committee were defeated at its founding meeting, which instead voted to seek amalgamation with the new Communist Party of Great Britain (CPGB), and Geddes acceded to this, becoming a member of the CPGB himself.

Geddes became the chair of the Greenock Unemployed Workers' Committee and was nominated by them to stand at the 1922 general election.  He also had the support of both the CPGB and the local trades and labour council and Independent Labour Party (ILP).  However, he did not try to win the support of the national Labour Party to stand as an official candidate for them.  He took 9,776 votes, coming second with 34.1% of the votes cast.  He was again nominated by the local trades and labour council for the 1923 election; in protest, the ILP withdrew from the council, and it was derecognised by the national Labour Party.  Despite this, he increased his vote in the election to 10,335 votes, 38% of the total.  Around this time, he also won election to Greenock parish council, serving a single term.

At the 1924 general election, Geddes was again adopted by the local trades council, but this time ran against an official Labour Party candidate, a member of the ILP.  He managed to beat the official candidate, taking second place, with 29.0%.  His final contest came in 1929, again against Labour opposition, when he took 20%.

Geddes visited the Soviet Union in 1925, where he viewed the Red Army on the Polish border, and received a banner from the Samara Cavalry Division as a gift, which he presented to the CPGB.  His daughter, Effie, became a leading figure in the CPGB's "British Pioneers" children's movement.  She led a group of Pioneers on a tour of Russia in 1933, but unexpectedly became ill and died.  Following this, Geddes appears to have withdrawn from activism.

References

1878 births
20th-century deaths
Year of death missing
Communist Party of Great Britain councillors
Councillors in Scotland
People from Wick, Caithness
Scottish communists